The following highways are numbered 984:

Canada

United States